This is a list of candidates for the 2021 German federal election.

There were 6,211 candidates in total. Of these, 1,284 ran only in the 299 single-member constituencies while 2,851 ran only on party lists. 2,076 candidates ran in both a constituency and on a party list.

Competing parties 
A total of 47 parties and lists were approved to run in the 2021 federal election, including the seven which won seats in the 19th Bundestag. Of these, 40 ran party lists in at least one state, while 7 ran only direct candidates. Further, 196 independent candidates ran in the various direct constituencies.

In the table below, green shading indicates that the party ran a list in the indicated state. The number in each box indicates how many direct candidates the party ran in the indicated state.

By state
In the tables below, green shading indicates that the candidate was an incumbent.

Schleswig-Holstein

Mecklenburg-Vorpommern

Hamburg

Lower Saxony

Bremen

Brandenburg

Saxony-Anhalt

Berlin

North Rhine-Westphalia

Saxony

Hesse

Thuringia

Rhineland-Palatinate

Bavaria

Baden-Württemberg

Saarland

Retiring deputies

CDU/CSU

 Norbert Barthle
 Manfred Behrens
 Sybille Benning
 Peter Bleser
 Norbert Brackmann
 Maria Flachsbarth
 Hans-Joachim Fuchtel
 Alois Gerig
 Eberhard Gienger
 Astrid Grotelüschen
 Mark Hauptmann
 Matthias Heider
 Heribert Hirte
 Karl Holmeier
 Alois Karl
 Volker Kauder, former CDU/CSU parliamentary leader
 Andreas Lämmel
 Karl A. Lamers
 Katharina Landgraf
 Nikolas Löbel
 Thomas de Maizière, former Minister of the Interior
 Hans-Georg von der Marwitz
 Angela Merkel, incumbent Chancellor
 Hans Michelbach
 Elisabeth Motschmann
 Gerd Müller, incumbent Minister of Economic Cooperation and Development
 Michaela Noll
 Georg Nüßlein
 Martin Patzelt
 Joachim Pfeiffer
 Eckhardt Rehberg
 Lothar Riebsamen
 Anita Schäfer
 Klaus-Peter Schulze
 Uwe Schummer
 Patrick Sensburg
 Frank Steffel
 Karin Strenz
 Peter Tauber
 Arnold Vaatz
 Kees de Vries
 Peter Weiß
 Marian Wendt
 Tobias Zech

SPD

 Bela Bach
 Lothar Binding
 Ingrid Arndt-Brauer
 Fritz Felgentreu
 Ulrich Freese
 Dagmar Freitag
 Barbara Hendricks, former minister of Federal Ministry of the Environment, Nature Conservation and Nuclear Safety
 Marcus Held
 Gustav Herzog
 Thomas Jurk
 Arno Klare
 Daniela Kolbe
 Ralf Kapschack
 Christine Lambrecht, incumbent Minister for Justice and Consumer Protection
 Christian Lange
 Kirsten Lühmann
 Caren Marks
 Christoph Matschie
 Hilde Mattheis
 Markus Paschke
 Florian Pronold
 Sascha Raabe
 Ernst Dieter Rossmann
 Ulla Schmidt, former minister of Federal Ministry of Health
 Ursula Schulte
 Martin Schulz, SPD candidate for Chancellor in the 2017 federal election
 Swen Schulz
 Rainer Spiering
 Sonja Steffen
 Kerstin Tack
 Gabi Weber 
 Dagmar Ziegler, incumbent Vice President of the Bundestag

AfD
 Axel Gehrke
 Wilhelm von Gottberg
 Heiko Heßenkemper
 Lothar Maier
 Roman Reusch
 Heiko Wildberg

FDP

 Grigorios Aggelidis
 Britta Dassler
 Hartmut Ebbing
 Ulla Ihnen
 Marcel Klinge
 Alexander Kulitz
 Roman Müller-Böhm
 Martin Neumann
 Wieland Schinnenburg
 Frank Sitta
 Hermann Otto Solms, Father of the House
 Katja Suding

The Left

 Heidrun Bluhm-Förster
 Sylvia Gabelmann
 Fabio De Masi
 Ulla Jelpke
 Sabine Leidig
 Stefan Liebich
 Michael Leutert
 Niema Movassat
 Kirsten Tackmann
 Andreas Wagner
 Hubertus Zdebel

Greens
 Anja Hajduk
 Sylvia Kotting-Uhl
Monika Lazar
Friedrich Ostendorff
Frithjof Schmidt

Independents
 Frauke Petry, former leader of AfD

Notes

Sources

References

2021 elections in Germany
Federal elections in Germany
German political candidates